Ian Stewart (born 1946) is a Scottish former football player and manager.

Stewart worked as a civil servant while being involved in football on a part-time basis. He was player/manager of Brechin City in the late 1970s, but left that position in January 1980 to become manager of Arbroath. Stewart was sacked by Arbroath in November 1983, despite losing only 39 out of 132 league matches in charge. Arbroath had narrowly missed out on promotion in each of the previous two seasons.

Soon after leaving Arbroath, he was appointed manager of Montrose. He guided Montrose to promotion in 1984–85. He made a surprising appearances as a player for Montrose in September 1984, aged 38, when two players were unable to travel to an away match against Berwick Rangers. Montrose produced a surprise victory against Hearts at Tynecastle in a 1986–87 Scottish League Cup tie. It was the first time any visiting team had won at Tynecastle in fifteen months.

References

1940s births
Living people
Scottish footballers
Association football wingers
Arbroath F.C. players
Dundee United F.C. players
Forfar Athletic F.C. players
Montrose F.C. players
Brechin City F.C. players
Scottish Football League players
Scottish football managers
Brechin City F.C. managers
Arbroath F.C. managers
Montrose F.C. managers
Scottish Football League managers